Events from the year 1954 in Michigan.

Top stories
The Associated Press United Press and Detroit Free Press, each separately ranked the state's top news stories of 1954 as follows:
 Democrat election victory. Landslide victory by Democrats in the November election, including Patrick V. McNamara's defeat of U.S. Senator Homer Ferguson and Governor G. Mennen Williams' election to a fourth term (AP#1, 217 points; UP#1; DFP#1)
 Mackinac Bridge. The start of construction on the Mackinac Bridge (AP#2, 162 points; UP#2; DFP#10)
 Small acquittal. The acquittal of Dr. Kenneth Small on charges that he murdered New York playboy Jules Lack, who was having an affair with Small's wife, at a Lake Michigan vacation home near Douglas, Michigan (AP#3, 153 points; UP#3; DFP#2)
 Death of Sen. Moody. On July 20 death, U.S. Senator Blair Moody died from chronic viral pneumonia and heart failure at University Hospital in Ann Arbor at age 52 (AP#4; DFP#5)
 Escape from Jackson. The escape of 13 inmates, with two women as hostages, from Michigan State Prison in Jackson (AP#5)
 State equalization. A decision of the Michigan Supreme Court making state equalization the basis for local property taxes (AP#6)
 Donald Ritchie. Donald Ritchie's false confession to the 1948 attempted assassination of Walter Reuther (AP#7; DFP#6)
 Automotive merger. The merger of independent automobile makers, including Studebaker, Packard, and Hudson, to become more competitive with the Big Three (AP#8; DFP#3)
 Bingo vote. The November 2 vote against legalizing bingo (AP#9)
 "Bird dog" controversy. Secretary of Defense C.E. Wilson's drew criticism for his October 11 comments about unemployment: "I have always liked bird dogs better than kennel-fed dogs. The bird dog is one that will go out and hunt for its food. The kennel-fed dog is one that waits until it is brought to him. (AP#10; DFP#8)
 Automobile production race, including Chrysler "face-lifting" (DFP#4)
 Judge John P. O'Hara's grand jury investigation of police (DFP#7)
 The murder of a four-year-old girl by 15-year-old Terrance DeMoss (DFP#9)

Office holders

State office holders

 Governor of Michigan: G. Mennen Williams (Democrat)
 Lieutenant Governor of Michigan: Clarence A. Reid (Republican)
 Michigan Attorney General: Frank Millard (Republican)
 Michigan Secretary of State: Owen Cleary (Republican)
 Speaker of the Michigan House of Representatives: Wade Van Valkenburg (Republican)
 Chief Justice, Michigan Supreme Court:

Mayors of major cities

 Mayor of Detroit: Albert Cobo (Republican)
 Mayor of Grand Rapids: Paul G. Goebel/George Veldman
 Mayor of Flint: Donald W. Riegle Sr./George M. Algoe
 Mayor of Saginaw: George H. Fischer
 Mayor of Dearborn: Orville L. Hubbard
 Mayor of Lansing: Ralph Crego
 Mayor of Ann Arbor: William E. Brown Jr.

Federal office holders
 U.S. Senator from Michigan: Homer S. Ferguson (Republican)
 U.S. Senator from Michigan: Charles E. Potter (Republican) 
 House District 1: Thaddeus M. Machrowicz (Democrat)
 House District 2: George Meader (Republican)
 House District 3: Paul W. Shafer (Republican)
 House District 4: Clare Hoffman (Republican)
 House District 5: Gerald Ford (Republican)
 House District 6: Kit Clardy (Republican)
 House District 7: Jesse P. Wolcott (Republican)
 House District 8: Alvin Morell Bentley (Republican)
 House District 9: Ruth Thompson (Republican)
 House District 10: Elford Albin Cederberg (Republican)
 House District 11: Victor A. Knox (Republican)
 House District 12: John B. Bennett (Republican)
 House District 13: George D. O'Brien (Democrat)
 House District 14: Louis C. Rabaut (Democrat)
 House District 15: John Dingell Sr. (Democrat)
 House District 16: John Lesinski Jr. (Democrat)
 House District 17: Charles G. Oakman (Republican)
 House District 18: George Anthony Dondero (Republican)

Population

Sports

Baseball

 1954 Detroit Tigers season – Under manager Fred Hutchinson, the Tigers compiled a 68–86 record and finished in fifth place in the American League. The team's statistical leaders included Harvey Kuenn with a .306 batting average, Ray Boone with 20 home runs and 85 RBIs, Steve Gromek with 18 wins, and Bob Miller with a 2.45 earned run average.
 1954 Michigan Wolverines baseball team - Under head coach Ray Fisher, the Wolverines compiled a 22–9 record. Jack Corbett was the team captain.

American football

 1954 Detroit Lions season – Under head coach Buddy Parker, the Lions compiled a 9–2–1 record, finished in first place in the NFL Western Conference, and lost the 1954 NFL Championship Game to the Cleveland Browns. The team's statistical leaders included Bobby Layne with 1,818 passing yards, Lew Carpenter with 476 rushing yards, Dorne Dibble with 768 receiving yards, and Doak Walker with 106 points scored (five touchdowns, 43 extra points, and 11 field goals).
 1954 Michigan Wolverines football team – Under head coach Bennie Oosterbaan, the Wolverines finished in a tie for second place in the Big Ten Conference with a record of 6–3 and were ranked No. 15 in the final AP and UPI Polls.  Left tackle Art Walker was selected as a first-team All-American.
 1954 Michigan State Spartans football team – Under head coach Duffy Daugherty, the Spartans compiled a 3–6 record. 
 1954 Central Michigan Chippewas football team – Under head coach Kenneth "Bill" Kelly, the Chippewas compiled an 8–2 record and tied for the Interstate Intercollegiate Athletic Conference (IIAC) championship. 
 1954 Detroit Titans football team – The Titans compiled a 2–7 record under head coach Wally Fromhart.
 1954 Michigan State Normal Hurons football team – Under head coach Fred Trosko, the Hurons compiled a 7–2 record and tied with Central Michigan for the IIAC championship.
 1954 Western Michigan Broncos football team – Under head coach Jack Petoskey, the Broncos compiled a 4–5 record.

Basketball
 1953–54 Michigan Wolverines men's basketball team – Under head coach William Perigo, the Wolverines compiled a 9–13 record. Jim Barron was the team's leading scorer with 377 points in 22 games for an average of 17.1 points per game.
 1953–54 Michigan State Spartans men's basketball team – Under head coach Pete Newell, the Spartans compiled a 9–13 record.
 1953–54 Detroit Titans men's basketball team – The Titans compiled an 11–17 record under head coach Bob Calihan.
 1953–54 Western Michigan Broncos men's basketball team – Under head coach Joseph Hoy, the Broncos compiled a 10–11 record.

Ice hockey

 1953–54 Detroit Red Wings season – Under head coach Tommy Ivan, the Red Wings compiled a 37–19–14 record and defeated the Montreal Canadiens in seven games in the 1954 Stanley Cup Finals. Gordie Howe led the team with 33 goals, 48 assists, and 81 points. The team's goaltender was Terry Sawchuk.  
 1953–54 Michigan Wolverines men's ice hockey team – Under head coach Vic Heyliger, the team compiled a 15–6–2 record and finished third in the 1954 NCAA Division I Men's Ice Hockey Tournament.
 1953–54 Michigan State Spartans men's ice hockey team – Under head coach Amo Bessone, the Spartans compiled an 8–14–1 record.
 1953–54 Michigan Tech Huskies men's ice hockey team – Under head coach Al Renfrew, Michigan Tech compiled a 7–17–1 record.

Boat racing
 Port Huron to Mackinac Boat Race – 
 APBA Gold Cup –

Golfing
 Michigan Open – 
 Motor City Open -

Other

Chronology of events

January

February

March

April

May

June

July

August

September

October

November
 November 2 - A number of elections occurred, including:
 Michigan House of Representatives - Robert Mahoney was elected to the Michigan House of Representatives seat representing the Wayne County 3rd district, becoming the first blind member of the Michigan Legislature.

December

Births 
 February 2 - Christie Brinkley, model and actress, in Monroe, Michigan
 March 20 - Steve McCatty, Major League Baseball pitcher (1977–1985), AL wins leader in 1981, in Detroit
 April 6 - Aaron Kyle, NFL cornerback (1976–1982), in Detroit
 April 23 - Michael Moore,  documentary filmmaker (Roger & Me, Bowling for Columbine, Fahrenheit 9/11) and author, in Flint, Michigan
 May 31 - Paul Franklin, multi-instrumentalist, known mainly for his work as a steel guitarist, in Detroit
 October 8 - Tom Price, current Secretary of Health and Human Services, in Lansing, Michigan
 November 23 - Debbie Dingell, U.S. Representative from Michigan, wife of John Dingell who served for 60 years before her, in Detroit

Gallery of 1954 births

Deaths
 May 3 - Philip Bartelme, athletic director of the University of Michigan (1909–1921), credited with bringing basketball, hockey and swimming to varsity status, at age 77 in Carmel, California
 July 20 - Blair Moody, United States Senator from Michigan (1951–1952), at age 52 in Ann Arbor

Gallery of 1954 deaths

See also
 History of Michigan
 History of Detroit

References